Jean-Jacques Rebière (born 17 November 1952) is a French former cyclist. He competed in the individual and team pursuit events at the 1976 Summer Olympics.

References

External links
 

1952 births
Living people
French male cyclists
Olympic cyclists of France
Cyclists at the 1976 Summer Olympics
Sportspeople from Gironde
French track cyclists
Cyclists from Nouvelle-Aquitaine